Elections to the French National Assembly were held in Morocco on 21 October 1945 as part of wider French elections.

Results

References

Morocco
Morocco
Elections in Morocco
1945 in Morocco